The European Junior Judo Championships are annual judo competitions organized by the European Judo Union for European judoka aged 21 and younger.

The last contest took place in Prague, Czech Republic. The next will take place in The Hague, Netherlands.

Competitions

Team competitions

See also
 European Judo Championships
 European U23 Judo Championships
 European Cadet Judo Championships

References

 
U21
Judo, U21
U21
European Championships, U21
Judo, European Championships U21